The Hirzer is a mountain in the Sarntal Alps in South Tyrol, Italy.

References 
 Alpenverein South Tyrol 

Mountains of the Alps
Mountains of South Tyrol
Sarntal Alps